Patrick Aloysius McCue (24 June 1883 – 10 September 1962) was an Australian representative rugby union player and pioneer rugby league footballer. He was a dual-code rugby international and an Olympic gold medallist.

Rugby union career
A forward with the Newtown Rugby Union club in Sydney, McCue was selected on the first Wallaby tour of England in 1908–1909, the squad captained by Herbert Moran. That side competed in the 1908 Summer Olympics in London and McCue was a member of the Australia national rugby union team captained by Chris McKivat which won the gold medal. Paddy McCue also coached the St. George Rugby Union Club in the 1930s.

Rugby league club career
Along with fourteen of his Olympic Wallaby teammates on his return to Australia he negotiated to take part in promotional matches against the Pioneer Kangaroos and was promptly banned from the amateur code by the Metropolitan Rugby Union. McCue and a number of the rebels joined the Newtown club in Sydney in 1910. They included gold medallist Wallabies John "Jumbo" Barnett and Charles "Boxer" Russell. He helped the club win premiership honours that year, playing at second-row forward in the 1910 NSWRFL season's final.

McCue played seven seasons with Newtown and after retiring as a player was assistant coach of the University club in its inaugural first grade season of 1920. He later returned to rugby union, coaching the University rugby union team in seasons 1926, 1927, 1932, 1935, 1942, 1943 and 1944. Paddy McCue was the elder brother of Jim McCue, who also played with Newtown between 1911–1919.

In 2008, the centenary year of rugby league in Australia, McCue was named in the Newtown Jets 18-man team of the century.

Rugby league representative career
McCue was selected to represent New South Wales in 1911 and later led New South Wales as captain on the 1912-13 tour of New Zealand.

He was selected on the 1911–12 Kangaroo tour of Great Britain which was an Australasian squad including four New Zealanders. McCue made his international rugby league debut in the first Test of 1911 at Newcastle upon Tyne and played in all three Tests of the series, as well as in twenty other minor tour matches, scoring seven tries all told on the tour. His final international appearance was in the first test of the 1914 domestic Ashes series.

See also
 Rugby union at the 1908 Summer Olympics

Footnotes

References
 Whiticker, Alan & Hudson, Glen (2006) The Encyclopedia of Rugby League Players, Gavin Allen Publishing, Sydney
 Andrews, Malcolm (2006) The ABC of Rugby League Austn Broadcasting Corpn, Sydney

External links
 
 
 Paddy McCue at RLP

1883 births
Australian rugby league players
Australian rugby union coaches
Australian rugby union players
Australia international rugby union players
Rugby union players at the 1908 Summer Olympics
Dual-code rugby internationals
Olympic rugby union players of Australasia
Olympic gold medalists for Australasia
Newtown Jets players
New South Wales rugby league team players
Australia national rugby league team players
1962 deaths
Australasia rugby league team players
Medalists at the 1908 Summer Olympics
Rugby league players from Sydney
Annandale rugby league players
Western Suburbs Magpies players
Rugby union players from Sydney
Rugby union locks